The 2012 Atlantic Sun men's basketball tournament took place from February 29 – March 3, 2012 at University Center in Macon, Georgia. Belmont, in its final year in the A-Sun before moving to the Ohio Valley Conference, won the tournament and with it an automatic bid to the NCAA tournament.

Format
The A-Sun Championship was a four-day single-elimination tournament. Eight teams competed in the championship and the participants were determined by conference winning percentage. The winner of the tournament earned the A-Sun's automatic bid into the 2012 NCAA tournament.

Bracket

See also
2011-12 NCAA Division I men's basketball season
Atlantic Sun men's basketball tournament

External links 
Atlantic Sun Men's Basketball Championship Tournament Central

ASUN men's basketball tournament
Tournament
Atlantic Sun men's basketball tournament
Atlantic Sun men's basketball tournament
Atlantic Sun men's basketball tournament